Finnmarksvidda is Norway's largest plateau, with an area greater than . Approximately 36% of Finnmark lies on the Finnmarksvidda.

Geography 

The southeastern part of the plateau is protected by the Øvre Anárjohka National Park. The  park opened in 1976.

Some circular lakes in Finnmarksvidda may be remnants of collapsed pingos that developed during cold periods of the last deglaciation.

Fauna and flora 
The plateau includes extensive birch woods, pine barrens, bogs, and glacially formed lakes. Finnmarksvidda is situated north of the Arctic Circle and is best known as the land of the once nomadic Sami people and their reindeer herds. Their shelters in the tundra are still used in the winter time.

Climate 

The climate of Kautokeino (307 m) represents the climate of the plateau.

References

Landforms of Troms og Finnmark
Plateaus of Norway
Porsanger